The external obturator muscle, obturator externus muscle (OE) is a flat, triangular muscle, which covers the outer surface of the anterior wall of the pelvis.

It is sometimes considered part of the medial compartment of thigh, and sometimes considered part of the gluteal region.

Structure
It arises from the margin of bone immediately around the medial side of the obturator membrane and surrounding bone, viz., from the inferior pubic ramus, and the ramus of the ischium; it also arises from the medial two-thirds of the outer surface of the obturator membrane, and from the tendinous arch which completes the canal for the passage of the obturator vessels and nerves.

The fibers springing from the pubic arch extend on to the inner surface of the bone, where they obtain a narrow origin between the margin of the foramen and the attachment of the obturator membrane.

The fibers converge and pass posterolateral and upward, and end in a tendon which runs across the back of the neck of the femur and lower part of the capsule of the hip joint and is inserted into the trochanteric fossa of the femur.

Relations
The obturator vessels lie between the muscle and the obturator membrane; the anterior branch of the obturator nerve reaches the thigh by passing in front of the muscle, and the posterior branch by piercing it.

Variation 
In 33% of people a supernumerary muscle is found between the adductor brevis and minimus.  While this muscle, when present, is similar to its neighbouring adductors, it is formed by separation from the superficial layer of the external obturator, and is thus not ontogenetically related to the adductor muscles of the hip.  This muscle originates from the upper part of the inferior pubic ramus from where it runs downwards and laterally. In half of cases, it inserts into the anterior surface of the insertion aponeurosis of the adductor minimus. In the remaining cases, it is either inserted into the upper part of the pectineal line or the posterior part of the lesser trochanter.

It has been demonstrated by the course of the posterior branch of obturator nerve that the obturator externus is divided into a superior muscle fascicle and a main belly.  The supernumerary muscle described above originates from the superior fascicle, while an anomalous fascicle — also derived from the external obturator  — originates from the main belly.  The "original" external obturator, i.e. without these supernumerary muscular parts, actually occurs in only 20% of cases, and apparently the external obturator readily undergoes ontogenetic variations.

Function

The external obturator muscle acts as the lateral rotator of the hip joint. As a short muscle around the hip joint, it stabilizes the hip joint as a postural muscle. It also helps to abduct the hip joint when in flexion.

Additional images

See also

References

External links
 
 
 PTCentral

Hip muscles
Deep lateral rotators of the hip
Hip lateral rotators
Medial compartment of thigh
Muscles of the lower limb